Union Storage and Warehouse Company Building is a historic warehouse building located at Charlotte, Mecklenburg County, North Carolina. It was built in 1927, and is a two-story, rectangular, reinforced concrete building on a raised concrete basement.  The building has a red brick veneer, steel sash windows, and a parapet facade.  The warehouse was purchased by the Ford Motor Company and converted to an auto repair establishment in 1942.

It was added to the National Register of Historic Places in 2000.

References

Commercial buildings on the National Register of Historic Places in North Carolina
Commercial buildings completed in 1927
Buildings and structures in Charlotte, North Carolina
National Register of Historic Places in Mecklenburg County, North Carolina